Sędzisław  is a village in the administrative district of Gmina Marciszów, within Kamienna Góra County, Lower Silesian Voivodeship, in south-western Poland.

Gallery

References

Villages in Kamienna Góra County